The Star Wars Celebration is a fan gathering to celebrate the Star Wars franchise. It began in 1999, when Lucasfilm held the Star Wars Celebration in Denver, Colorado to celebrate the upcoming release of Star Wars: Episode I – The Phantom Menace. Subsequent events have taken place to welcome forthcoming movies, as well as honoring the 30th and 40th anniversaries of the release of the original film.

Overview

Events

Celebration I

The Star Wars Celebration was held from April 30 – May 2, 1999, at the Wings Over the Rockies Air and Space Museum in Denver, Colorado, just three weeks before the release of The Phantom Menace.  An event "for the fans, by the fans," the event took place in the hometown of the Official Star Wars Fan Club, headed by Dan Madsen.  "The Fan Club is based here in Denver," says Madsen, "so we thought it would only be appropriate that the Celebration be held here."

The first Star Wars convention since 1987, the Celebration held activities including actor panels, THX theater demonstrations, behind the scenes footage from Episode I, and the world premiere of the "Duel of the Fates" music video.  The grounds boasted a vendors tent, and the museum hosted an exhibition consisting of props from the official LucasFilm archives, including a full-scale model of Anakin Skywalker's podracer and a life-size X-wing model (a 3/4 scale replica made in 1996 for the Special Edition release, and still residing at Wings Over the Rockies Air and Space Museum).

Celebration II
From May 3–5, 2002, Celebration II was held to celebrate the upcoming release of Attack of the Clones.  The convention was moved to Indianapolis, Indiana, to make use of the larger Indiana Convention Center.

Downtown Indianapolis was invaded by multitudes of Star Wars fans. The initial projection of 15–20,000 people per day based on advance ticket sales was well surpassed and reached critical mass on Saturday. The estimated final tally was a little over 75,000 people for the three-day event.  The two busiest spots were the Fan Club store and the autograph section, specifically for Carrie Fisher. Highlights of the event included the Rick McCallum Spectacular and the Star Wars 25th Anniversary Concert on Saturday night, performed by the Indianapolis Symphony Orchestra.

Celebration III
The Star Wars Celebration returned to Indianapolis from April 21–24, 2005, to commemorate the release of what was then thought to be the final film in the saga, Revenge of the Sith. With over 34,000 fans in attendance over the course of four days, Celebration III brought actor panels, costume contests, fan films, and diorama building to the Indiana Convention Center. The Lucasfilm archive provided many important props and costumes for display. One of this Celebration's most noteworthy events was the unprecedented Q&A session with Star Wars creator George Lucas, his first such appearance since the Star Wars 10th Anniversary Convention in 1987. With approximately 10,000 fans in attendance (over the course of 3 half-hour sessions), Lucas personally answered several dozen fans' questions about the saga.

Celebration IV

On May 26, 2006, StarWars.com announced Star Wars Celebration IV (C4) to be held May 24–28, 2007, to commemorate the 30th anniversary of the first Star Wars film. C4 was located at the Los Angeles Convention Center in Los Angeles. Taking place on May 24 through May 28, the convention offered a record number of celebrities in the autograph hall, multiple exhibitors, a Star Wars art show, a Darth Vader helmet and Lucasfilm archive exhibits and many fan oriented activities. In addition, there were collector and costuming panels, including sneak peeks of the upcoming Clone Wars animated  series. Fans were the first to see the footage of this series on Sunday morning as well.  Other highlights included conversations with Carrie Fisher and Billy Dee Williams, a visit from Seth MacFarlane and Seth Green for  special Star Wars episodes of Family Guy and Robot Chicken respectively, and an efficiently organized Celebration Store. An estimated 35,000 people walked through the doors for Celebration IV over the Memorial Day weekend.

After the event, Lucasfilm sued the hosting entity, GenCon, for a variety of reasons, forcing GenCon into Chapter 11 bankruptcy.

Celebration Europe
On September 25, 2006, StarWars.com announced Star Wars Celebration Europe (CE) to be held July 13–15, 2007, to commemorate the 30th anniversary of the first Star Wars film. CE was to be located at Earls Court in London. But on November 22, 2006, StarWars.com announced due to Advance interest in Celebration Europe the event would be moved to the larger venue located at the ExCeL Exhibition Centre in London. The event also had on display some of the largest restored Star Wars Arcade collection, estimated at around 30 to 40 machines, many of them now rarely seen in the USA or in other parts of Europe. An estimated 30,000 people attended this convention.

Celebration Japan
On February 23, 2008, Lucasfilm Ltd. and the Lewis Daniel Group announced a three-day event known as "Celebration Japan", was held at the Makuhari-Messe Convention Center near Tokyo on July 19 to 21. The convention celebrated the 30th anniversary of the June 24, 1978, Japanese premiere of Star Wars. Celebration Japan included live entertainment, Star Wars celebrities, exclusive merchandise, special presentations, unique Star Wars exhibits, costume contests, and other activities.

Celebration V
Lucasfilm announced in 2008 that a US-based four-day Star Wars convention called "Celebration V" would be held in the summer of 2010. In July 2008, Steve Sansweet, director of content management and head of fan relations for Lucasfilm, announced that Baltimore, Minneapolis, Chicago, Indianapolis, Los Angeles, Anaheim, and Orlando, Florida were competing to host this event. Organizers anticipated that 30,000 Star Wars fans would attend no matter which city was selected.

Reed Exhibitions and Lucasfilm announced on December 3, 2009, that Orlando would host the event. Celebration V took place at the Orange County Convention Center from August 12–15, 2010. The convention celebrated the 30th anniversary of the second Star Wars movie, The Empire Strikes Back. It also included many features of previous Celebrations (such as Star Wars celebrity appearances, costume contests, and other fan events) as well as a special one-hour interview between Jon Stewart and George Lucas called "The Main Event". Celebration V marked the first American Celebration appearance for Mark Hamill (Luke Skywalker) and the last American appearance for Caroline Blakiston (Mon Mothma). Attendance was estimated at 32,000.

Lucas also made an appearance at the nearby Disney's Hollywood Studios to take part in the "Last Tour to Endor Event", which provided special entertainment for those individuals who attended "Celebration V".

Celebration VI
StarWarsCelebration.com announced on June 2, 2011, that Celebration VI would be held in Orlando, FL at the Orange County Convention Center (OCCC) from August 16–19, 2012.  The date was later changed to August 23–26, 2012. The convention was held in the same hall of the OCCC as was Celebration V, with a very similar format. Several celebrities returned for appearances at this Celebration (including Mark Hamill, Carrie Fisher, and Anthony Daniels), and this event marked the first American Celebration attended by Ian McDiarmid. George Lucas had not been scheduled to attend, but made a "surprise" appearance. The event hosted the announcement of Star Wars Detours. Attendance was estimated at 35,000 people.

Celebration Europe II
It was announced at the Closing Ceremonies of Celebration VI (and confirmed on StarWarsCelebration.com) that Celebration Europe II would be held in Essen, Germany, at the Messe Essen fair venue from July 26–28, 2013. Major panels were Kathleen Kennedy inaugural Star Wars Celebration appearance and the first look at Star Wars Rebels. Over 30,000 people attended the event from 40 different countries. The convention celebrated the 30th anniversary of the third Star Wars movie, Return of The Jedi.

Celebration Anaheim

It was announced at the closing ceremonies of Celebration Europe II that Celebration Anaheim would be held in Anaheim, California, at the Anaheim Convention Center, from April 16–19, 2015, with an anticipated turnout of about 50,000 fans.

This event was one of the most anticipated due to the December 2015 release of Star Wars: The Force Awakens with most news and info on the film being kept secretive prior to the event. The entire celebration was broadcast live online free via www.starwars.com and the Star Wars' YouTube channel. The long-awaited second teaser trailer for the Star Wars: The Force Awakens premiered on April 16, 2015, during the opening panel of the event which also included many of the stars of the upcoming film, new and old, director J. J. Abrams along with producer and president of Lucasfilm, Kathleen Kennedy. The following day, fans were treated to the trailer for the upcoming videogame, Star Wars: Battlefront while on the third day the trailer for the second season of Star Wars Rebels made its debut. The Celebration closed out its fourth and final day with fans being shown an exclusive teaser trailer for Rogue One, which was released in December 2016. This is the first of two anthology films, which are also known as the stand-alone or origin story films.

Celebration Europe III
It was announced on April 19, 2015, during the closing ceremonies at Celebration Anaheim, that Celebration Europe III would take place July 15–17, 2016, at the ExCel center in London, England.  "Jedi Master VIP Tickets" sold out immediately.  This was the last Star Wars Celebration that the original trilogy stars Kenny Baker and Carrie Fisher would attend, due to their passing in mid to late 2016.

Celebration Orlando
It was announced on July 17, 2016, during the closing ceremonies at Celebration Europe III, that Celebration Orlando would take place April 13–16, 2017, in Orlando, Florida. The convention celebrated the 40th Anniversary of Star Wars: A New Hope and the upcoming film, Star Wars: The Last Jedi. This was the first Star Wars Celebration that Harrison Ford attended. He made an appearance during the opening panel celebrating the 40 years of Star Wars held on April 13 which also included other stars and people important to the franchise including Kathleen Kennedy (president of Lucasfilm) and a surprise appearance by George Lucas and John Williams with the Orlando Philharmonic Orchestra, who performed parts of the soundtrack. A special tribute to Carrie Fisher was held by Mark Hamill on Friday, April 14. A teaser trailer of Star Wars: The Last Jedi premiered on Friday, April 14. On Saturday, April 15 it was announced that season 4 of Star Wars Rebels will be the last season of the series. The celebration was once again streamed live and free via StarWars.com and the Star Wars YouTube channel.

Celebration Chicago
The thirteenth Star Wars Celebration was held from April 11–15, 2019 inside Chicago's McCormick Place. A teaser trailer and title reveal for Star Wars: The Rise of Skywalker occurred on April 12; a franchise mural including art from the upcoming film was also unveiled. A trailer for the upcoming game Star Wars Jedi: Fallen Order was also showcased as well as teaser reels for The Clone Wars Season 7 and the new Disney+ exclusive show, The Mandalorian. It was announced in June 2019 that Celebration Chicago drew an estimated 65,000 fans.

Also during Star Wars Celebration Chicago, Lucasfilm sound editor Matthew Wood teased that there would be a new Lego Star Wars Game.

Celebration Anaheim II

It was announced on April 15, 2019, the last day of Celebration Chicago, that in 2020, the next Star Wars Celebration will be held for the second time in Anaheim, California. On June 15, 2020, it was announced that the 2020 Celebration had been cancelled due to the COVID-19 pandemic, with the next event scheduled for August 18–21, 2022 at the Anaheim Convention Center. The dates were later updated to May 26–29, 2022.

Celebration Europe IV 
It was announced on May 29, 2022, during Celebration Anaheim II, that the next Celebration would be held at the ExCel Centre in London, England over April 7–10, 2023.

References

External links

Official Star Wars Celebration website
Official Star Wars Celebration Europe website
Lucasfilm's Star Wars Celebration website

Star Wars fandom
Recurring events established in 1999
Science fiction conventions in the United States